Radiomen is an American science fiction novel by Eleanor Lerman.

Plot
Laurie Perzin is a middle-aged bartender in Queens that works nights at Kennedy airport. She lives an unremarkable life, having no close family and a childhood memory of a mysterious encounter with "the radioman." When she was six she met a shadowy figure when listening to her uncle’s radio.  She spends years pretending the meeting was a dream and it sets off a sequence of events that pull her into the company of a psychic, a radio host, a strange dog and the leader of a religious cult that believes aliens, including the radioman, are destined to bring humans to enlightenment.

Awards
The novel was the winner of the 2016 John W. Campbell Memorial Award for Best Science Fiction Novel.

References

2015 American novels
2015 science fiction novels
American science fiction novels
John W. Campbell Award for Best Science Fiction Novel-winning works
Novels about alien visitations
Permanent Press (publisher) books